Anna Selezneva (born 29 July 1990) is a Russian fashion model.

Early life

Anna was born in Moscow to a Russian father and a Russian mother with distant Armenian roots. She was discovered in 2007 at a McDonald's. Later that year, she began her international modeling career after signing with a top agency in Paris.

Career
Selezneva debuted on the runways of Dries van Noten, Céline, and Akris. Then she walked for all major brands and designers, including Alexander Wang, Balmain, Chanel, Christian Dior, Diane von Furstenberg, Dolce & Gabbana, Elie Saab, Emanuel Ungaro, Fendi, Giambattista Valli, Gianfranco Ferre, Giorgio Armani, Gucci, Hermès, Jean Paul Gaultier, Lanvin, Louis Vuitton, Marc Jacobs, Oscar de la Renta, Ralph Lauren, Roberto Cavalli, Valentino, Versace, Yves Saint Laurent and many others during the Spring Paris Fashion Week.

Selezneva was featured on the covers of many international fashion magazines, including  Vogue Paris, Vogue Italia, Vogue Spain, Vogue Russia, Vogue Australia, Vogue Japan, Vogue China, Vogue Mexico, Vogue Thailand, Numéro, Numéro TOKYO, Allure (Russia), Harper's Bazaar (Germany, Korea), Elle (Spain, Argentina), Interview (Germany), Tatler (Russia), Magazine Antidote, MIXT(E), S Moda, V Magazine.  She has also appeared in editorials in American Vogue, British Vogue, Vogue Germany, i-D, Harper's Bazaar, Muse Magazine, Self Service, The Last Magazine, Glamour (Russia), Porter Magazine.

Selezneva has appeared in advertising campaigns for Beymen Club, Massimo Dutti, Blumarine, Calvin Klein Collection, Cesare Paciotti, Emporio Armani, Fay, Guerlain «Aqua Allegoria» fragrance, Hogan, Hunkydory, John Galliano, Joop! Jeans, Juicy Couture, Mango, Marc O'Polo, Massimo Dutti, Moussy, Phi, Pierre Balmain, Pinko, Ralph Lauren, Replay, Santa Lolla, Santoni, System, Tory Burch, Trussardi, Vera Wang «Look» fragrance, Versace, Yves Saint Laurent «Elle Shocking» fragrance.

Vogue Paris declared Selezneva one of the top 30 models of the 2000s. Selezneva is ranked as one of the highest paid models by models.com.

Personal life
Selezneva has an undergraduate degree in Psychology, she also studied at the Marangoni Fashion Institute in Paris and plans to further her studies when her modeling career slows down.

References

External links 

Anna Selezneva at Dom Models.ru.
Anna Selezneva at Models.com.
 Anna Selezneva at the Fashion Model Directory
Anna Selezneva on Instagram.

Living people
1985 births
Female models from Moscow
Women Management models